Attilio Moresi (26 July 1933 – 25 April 1995) was a Swiss cyclist. He was the Swiss National Road Race champion in 1963.

Major results
1957
 2nd Tour de Quatre-Cantons
 3rd Overall Tour de Suisse
 5th Overall Tour de Romandie
1958
 2nd Tour de Quatre-Cantons
1960
 3rd Tour du Nord-Ouest
 4th Overall Tour de Suisse
 5th Overall Tour de Romandie
1961
 1st  Overall Tour de Suisse
1962
 6th Züri-Metzgete
1963
 1st  Road race, National Road Championships
 3rd Overall Tour de Suisse
1st Stage 4
 8th Overall Paris–Luxembourg
1964
 7th GP du canton d'Argovie
1965
 6th Züri-Metzgete

References

External links

1937 births
1995 deaths
Sportspeople from Lugano
Swiss male cyclists
Tour de Suisse stage winners